Santos FC is a football club based in Santos, that competes in the Campeonato Paulista,
 São Paulo's state league, and the Campeonato Brasileiro Série A or Brasileirão, Brazil's national league. The club was founded in 1912 by the initiative of three sports enthusiasts from Santos by the names of Raimundo Marques, Mário Ferraz de Campos, and Argemiro de Souza Júnior, and played its first friendly match on June 23, 1914. Initially Santos played against other local clubs in the city and state championships, but in 1959 the club became one of the founding members of the Taça Brasil, Brazil's first truly national league. As of 2010, Santos is one of only five clubs never to have been relegated from the top level of Brazilian football, the others being São Paulo and Flamengo.

The club first participated in an international competition in 1956. The first international cup they took part in was the Torneio Internacional da FPF. Santos is the most successful club in the Brasileirão, alongside Palmeiras, and was voted by FIFA as the 5th most successful football club of the 20th century. The Santista club is the most successful club, alongside São Paulo, in Brazilian football in terms of overall trophies, having won 19 state titles, a record 8 national titles, 3 Copa Libertadores, 2 Intercontinental Cups, 1 Recopa Sudamericana, 1 Intercontinental Supercup, 1 Copa CONMEBOL and 1 Copa do Brasil. In 1962, Santos became the first club in the world to win the continental treble consisting of the Paulista, Taça Brasil, and the Copa Libertadores.

Flag legend 
 

 / 

 Bangkok

 /  / 

 Cochabamba

 Enschede

 Genoa

 João Monlevade

 Marseille

 / 

 Piracicaba

 Vancouver

 / Germany

International seasons

Copa Libertadores 

The Copa Libertadores, originally known as the Copa Campeones de América, is an annual international club football competition organized by CONMEBOL since 1960. It is the most prestigious club competition in South American football and one of the most watched events in the world, broadcast in 135 nations worldwide. The tournament is named in honor of the Libertadores (Portuguese and Spanish for Liberators), the main leaders of the South American wars of independence. The competition has had several different formats over its lifetime. Initially, only the champions of the South American leagues participated. In 1966, the runners-up of the South American leagues began to join; in 1998, Mexican teams were invited to compete. Today at least three clubs per country compete in the tournament, while Argentina and Brazil each have five clubs participating. Traditionally, a group stage has always been used but the number of teams per group has varied several times.

The tournament consists of six stages. In the present format, it begins in early February with the first stage. The six surviving teams from the first stage join 26 teams in the second stage, in which there are eight groups consisting of four teams each. The eight group winners and eight runners-up enter the final four stages, better known as the knockout stages, which ends with the finals anywhere between June and August. The winner of the Copa Libertadores becomes eligible to play in two extra tournaments: the FIFA Club World Cup and the Recopa Sudamericana. The reigning champion of the competition is Santos FC. This is the club's third title and the first in 49 years. Santos have participated in the Copa Libertadores 15 times, reaching the semifinals nine times and the final five times.

Supercopa Sudamericana 
The Supercopa Sudamericana was a club competition contested annually by the past winners of the Copa Libertadores. The cup is one of the many inter–South American club competitions that have been organised by CONMEBOL. The first competition was held in the 1988 season, and the last in 1997. Prior to its abolition, the Supercopa Sudamericana was regarded as the second most prestigious South American club competition out of the three major tournaments, behind the Copa Libertadores and ahead of the Copa CONMEBOL.

Recopa Sudamericana de Campeones Intercontinentales 
The Recopa Sudamericana de Campeones Intercontinentales was a club competition contested annually by the past South American winners of the Intercontinental Cup. The first competition was held in the 1968 season, and the last in 1969.

Copa CONMEBOL / Copa Sudamericana 
The Copa CONMEBOL was an annual cup competition played between 1992 and 1999 for eligible South American football clubs. During its time of existence, it was the third most prestigious South American club football contest after the Copa Libertadores and Supercopa Sudamericana. Teams that were not able to qualify for the Copa Libertadores played in this tournament. The tournament was played as a knockout cup. The tournament ended in 1999, following the expansion of Copa Libertadores to 32 teams.

The Copa Sudamericana is a competition contested since 2002 after the discontinuation of the Copa Merconorte and Copa Mercosur. Since its introduction, the competition has been a pure elimination tournament with the number of rounds and teams varying from year to year. The Copa Sudamericana is considered a merger of defunct tournaments such as the Copa CONMEBOL, Copa Mercosur and Copa Merconorte.

Recopa Sudamericana 
The Recopa Sudamericana was inaugurated in 1988 as a way of determining an ultimate South American winner, by pitting the holders of the Copa Libertadores against the winners of the Supercopa Sudamericana. After the latter's abolishment, the Copa Sudamericana winner participated against the Copa Libertadores champions.

Intercontinental Cup / FIFA Club World Cup 
In 1960, CONMEBOL and their European equivalent, the Union of European Football Associations (UEFA), created the Intercontinental Cup as a way of determining the best team in the world, by pitting the winners of the Copa Libertadores and the European Champions' Cup, now known as the UEFA Champions League, against each other. In 2000, FIFA launched their international club competition called the FIFA Club World Cup, featuring teams from all of its member associations. In the second edition of the Club World Cup, in 2005, FIFA took over the Intercontinental Cup, subsuming it into its own competition.

Intercontinental Supercup 
The Intercontinental Supercup was a competition endorsed by UEFA and CONMEBOL, contested between the winners of the European Intercontinental winner's group and the South American Recopa Sudamericana de Campeones Intercontinentales.

Overall record

Competitive record

Against national clubs 
Below is a list of all matches Santos have played against other clubs around Brazil:

Against AFC clubs 
Below is a list of all matches Santos have played against clubs from the Asian Football Confederation (AFC):

Against CAF clubs 
Below is a list of all matches Santos have played against clubs from the Confédération Africaine de Football (CAF):

Against CONCACAF clubs 
Below is a list of all matches Santos have played against clubs from the Confederation of North, Central American and Caribbean Association Football (CONCACAF):

Against CONMEBOL clubs 
Below is a list of all matches Santos have played against clubs from the Confederación Sudamericana de Fútbol (CONMEBOL):

Against UEFA clubs 
Below is a list of all matches Santos have played against clubs from the Union of European Football Associations (UEFA):

Against FIFA and non-FIFA teams 
Below is a list of all matches Santos have played against teams affiliated with the Fédération Internationale de Football Association (FIFA) and non-FIFA teams around the world:

References

South America
Santos